Petr Novák (6 September 1945 – 19 August 1997) was a Czech rock musician. He is best known for his romantic Beatles inspired pop songs with his bands George and Beatovens and Flamengo in the late 1960s.

Biography
Born in Prague, at the age of six, he began playing the piano. He originally aspired to become an actor, until hearing the Beatles and their lively Mersey sound music and starting a band with his friends. This band was briefly named The Beatles, but soon renamed George and Beatovens. Their western style music was popular with the Czech youth and they quickly rose to popularity as one of the nations most popular bands. especially during the Prague Spring. Their success was short-lived. Soon the allies of the Warsaw Pact invaded and the Warsaw Pact occupation began. Afterwards, he began a solo career and his fame continued to grow, despite strict government regulations.

The new, more conservative administration, who frowned upon Petr's western influenced music and his notorious hard partying and heavy drinking, encouraged venuesm local and national gigs not to hire Petr to perform. His career reached its peak c. 1975 with the release of his last truly successful album "Kráska a zvíře", and afterwards it led to a slow decline along with his growing alcohol problems brought his days as a popular and influential musician to a halt. His music suffered after longtime collaborator and lyricist Ivo Plicka fled the country in the late seventies, therefore the quality of his music, his voice, and his songs deteriorated. Although he continued until his death, his musical output never reached the critical success of his earlier work. In fact, many of the albums released in the 1980s proved to be both critical and commercial failures. There was renewed interest in his music after the Velvet Revolution, but he was too ill to re-establish himself in popular culture. 

He died in 1997, with his death certificate stating "suspect poisoning by unidentifiable poison X-49".

Bands
George and Beatovens
Flamengo

Discography
Albums
  – 1970, Panton
  – 1970, Panton, prod. Jiří Smetana
  – 1971, Panton
  – 1975, Panton
  – 1980, Panton
  – 12/1982, Panton
  – 1983, Panton
 Greatest Hits – 1984, Panton/Artia
  – 1985, Panton
  – 1986, Panton, prod. Ladislav Klein
 Memento – 4/1989, Panton
 Petr Novák Live – 12/1992, Monitor, live
  – 2/1996, Monitor
  – 10/1996
  – 2/1996, Bonton
  – 7/1999, Sony Music Bonton

Singles
  (1968, Panton)
  (1968, Panton)
  (1968, Panton), & L. Ročáková
 2. čs. beat-festival 68 (1969, Panton), (I Must Go From You / Be My Daughter)
  (1969, Panton)
  (1969, Panton)
  (1969, Panton)
  (1969, Panton)
  (1969, Panton)
 Be My Daughter / You Leave Me (1969, Sonet)
  (1970, Panton)
 Esther /  (1970, Panton)
  (1970, Panton)
  (1970, Panton)
  / Happy end (1970, Panton)
  (1971, Panton)
  (1971, Panton)
  (1971, Panton), & Jazzinky
  (1972, Panton)
  (1973, Panton)
  (1975, Panton)
  (1976, Panton), & Věra Mazánková
  (1977, Panton)
  (1979, Panton)
  (11/79, Panton)
  (4/80, Panton)
  (7/80), & Pavel Dydovič  Orchestrion & Katapult & Ladislav Smoljak
  (12/80, Panton), & Věra Wajsarová
  (12/81, Panton)
  (12/82, Panton)
  (6/83, Panton)
  (1983, Panton)
  (1985, Panton)
  (1987, Panton)

References

External links
 Cojeco.cz

1945 births
1997 deaths
Czech rock musicians
Czechoslovak Big Beat groups and musicians
Musicians from Prague